is a Japanese anime television series produced by Production I.G and directed by Kazuya Murata, and aired between April and June 2013. A manga adaptation began serialization in Kadokawa Shoten's Newtype Ace magazine in January 2013.

Plot
After a failed attempt by the Galactic Alliance to destroy an enemy super-weapon, Ledo is knocked into a wormhole and loses consciousness.

When he awakens, he discovers that he and Chamber have been "salvaged" by a rag-tag band of "primitive" human scavengers aboard the Gargantia, a massive fleet of ships on an ocean-covered planet. Chamber tells him that local star charts reveal the planet is Earth, the birthplace of humanity, a place that members of the Galactic Alliance were only familiar with from stories and believed was a myth. Ledo must adjust to the language, culture and lifestyle of the planet, while finding his new purpose in life aboard the Gargantia.

Characters

Main characters

A 16-year-old Galactic Alliance ensign. Trained as a soldier since birth, Ledo finds himself shipwrecked on Earth following a failed attempt by the army to destroy the Hideauze's home planet. As he interacts with his new surroundings and gets used to the crew of the Gargantia, Ledo is exposed to some concepts of human society long forgotten by his civilization (or at least obscured from its soldiery) due to its permanent state of total war against the Hideauze, like entertainment, cooperation and tolerance. Ledo gradually grows attached to his new friends on Gargantia.

A 15-year-old messenger who meets Ledo when he wakes up from hibernation and serves as his guide. She becomes Ledo's first and best friend, and from all the members of Gargantia, she is the one who gets closest to him, usually keeping him company and encouraging his efforts to fit himself into the fleet's environment. She eventually falls in love with him.

Gargantia

A 22-year-old high rank officer at the Gargantia, she is Fleet Commander Fairlock's second in command and daughter of his predecessor, Chevron. Following Fairlock's death, she takes over as Fleet Commander, following his wish.

The 18-year-old leader of the Gargantias excavation team.

The head of the Gargantias repairmen. His older brother was killed by whalesquid, and upon learning of Ledo's intention to exterminate them due to their connection to the Hideauze, he decides to assist him with the pretense of exploring the whalesquid territory for salvage work. After Ledo clears the area of the whalesquid, Pinion claims the technology salvaged by his crew to establish his own fleet, which is later annexed to Kugel's fleet. In the occasion, Pinion is appointed to be chief technician of Kugel's fleet in charge of developing weapons for it.

Amy's 10-year-old little brother with an illness that compromises his health, thus he is usually bedridden, and only moves by a wheelchair. He befriends Ledo, who treats him as a younger brother.

The fleet commander of the Gargantia, who despite being sick, refuses to relinquish his post. He appoints Ridget as his successor just before he passes away.

Amy's friend and a reserved 15-year-old messenger.

A hyper 14-year-old messenger who is also Amy's friend. She leaves Gargantia along with the many who decide to follow Pinion's plan.

A new character from the OVA series, she is a former member of Kugel's fleet who moves to the Gargantia and becomes the newest member of Amy's messenger team. She is later revealed as a spy for an unknown party, ordering a machine which resembles Chamber.

Amy's pet flying squirrel.

A major shipleader in the Gargantia who agrees with Pinion's plan and secedes from the fleet to accompany his efforts to reclaim technology from ancient civilizations. Later he is forced to join Kugel's fleet along the rest of his crew.

The resident doctor aboard Gargantia.

A young repair girl aboard Gargantia. She joins Pinion when he leads a group of the fleet away.

A mysterious lady.

Machine Calibers
Highly advanced mech used by the Galactic Alliance of Humankind which was established when the humans in space joined forces against its common enemy, the Hideauze.

Chamber is Ledo's male mecha and artificial intelligence assistant; a mass produced robot used in great numbers by the Galactic Alliance of Humankind. Chamber describes itself as a program designed specifically to ensure that its pilot excels at his or her assigned task, which in the case of Ledo is a soldier. Upon meeting the people of the Gargantia, Chamber manages to analyze and decode their language to act as a translator between Ledo and the people on Gargantia.

A Galactic Alliance female robot designed for higher ranked soldiers used by Kugel. Originally believed to serve as Kugel's life support system, as he was somehow unable to leave his cockpit due to a disease, it is later revealed that it was Striker's AI who was ordering the fleet instead of him, as the real Kugel was long dead inside it.

Other characters

A pirate leader who launched an attack on the Gargantia after Ledo kills some of her men to protect Bellows and her crew. Some time after being defeated by the Gargantias forces with Ledo's help, she reappears as part of Kugel's fleet, yet she helps to rebel against it.

Ledo's superior at the Galactic Alliance, who disappears after he decides to stay behind to allow Ledo and the others to escape after their failed attack on the Hideauze. Ledo eventually is contacted by his Machine Caliber Striker and learns that just like him, he got stranded on Earth and joined a fleet, but unlike Ledo, he remained inside his machine caliber due to a disease that prevents him from leaving, seized control over the fleet that found him, and instated a totalitarian militarist regime in the name of improving its strength and efficiency. However, it is later revealed that Kugel was long dead and Striker was posing as him instead.

Ridget's childhood friend. She is gentle-hearted, but she is brisk and efficient when it comes to her nursing job. Seven years before, Storia left the Gargantia to live with Ritona.

An old acquaintance of Ridget, he was chief mechanic of another fleet who went derelict after its main engine was damaged beyond repair. Before that, he falls in love with Storia and takes her to live with him.

Production
Gen Urobuchi explained on the official website that the message of the story is aimed towards those in their teens and 20s, who are either about to enter into society or recently have, and is meant to cheer them on and to encourage them that "going out into the world isn't scary". He also said that the feeling of this work will be different from others he's been involved with.

Development of Gargantia on the Verdurous Planet began around November 2010, according to producer Nao Hirasawa. Mechanical designer Makoto Ishiwata said that he began his design work about two months in, and that the mechanical designs were focused on bringing out aspects of the plot. The roundness of the Machine Caliber's design was meant to bring out a sense of gentleness and familiarity. The difference between the personalities of Chamber and Striker were to represent a sense of a child and a grown adult.

After about a half year's worth of production, Kazuya Murata was brought in as the series director. Murata had been harboring the desire to work on a story involving people living on ships atop a world of water about ten years before the series started. Some of the story had already been arranged, but he introduced the concept of people living on giant boats, and Urobuchi liked the idea a lot, and quickly worked it into the story. According to Urobuchi, as they revised the plot further, Murata tended to have a very good sense of judgement as to what to put in and what not to put in, and was clear about what he was looking for, so the organization went a lot more smoothly than he thought it might have. Urobuchi was put in charge of writing the first and last episodes once the green-light was given for a thirteen-episode series in order to set the theme for the other writers.

Some weeks after the series started airing, a character design contest related to the anime series was announced. It was hosted on Pixiv, and Murata and staff members of Production I.G judged the entries submitted until the deadline of May 12. Originally only one among the submitted designs would be chosen, however there were twelve entries which impressed the judges to the point of announcing all of them as winners. The twelve chosen characters made an appearance in the series finale on June 30, 2013.

Media

Novels
Starting a few months before the series aired, the official website began updating on a monthly basis to include short stories that further expand on the Gargantia universe. On April 3, 2015, at an event in Tokyo, Bandai Visual revealed that a sequel for the anime was planned, but due to "various circumstances", was scrapped. The sequel would instead be published as two novels, titled , which were published on August 29, 2015 and March 30, 2016 in Japan.

Manga
Gargantia on the Verdurous Planet received a manga adaptation, drawn by Wataru Mitogawa. The series' serialization began in the 17th issue of Kadokawa Shoten's Newtype Ace magazine, released on January 10, 2013, and after the magazine's final issue, July 10, 2013, it continued in Niconico's Kadokawa Niconico Ace web magazine. The manga has also been collected in three tankōbon volumes, published between April 8, 2013, and March 7, 2014. A spin-off manga series, titled , drawn by Shū with story assistance by Hiroki Uchida, began serialization in Enterbrain's Famitsu Comic Clear website on June 7, 2013. and ended on January 30, 2015. The series has been collected in two tankōbon volumes.

Anime
The anime was directed by Kazuya Murata and produced by Production I.G with character design by Hanaharu Naruko. Gen Urobuchi supervised and wrote the first and last episodes of the series. The anime aired on Tokyo MX from April 7 to June 30, 2013. It was streamed by Crunchyroll. A web short titled "Petit Gargantia" (Puchitto Gargantia) streamed on their official site for each episode. On March 30 and 31, 2013, at the Anime Contents Expo Bandai Visual's booth gave away 8000 copies of the first two episodes on Blu-ray Disc. An OVA 14th episode was released along with first Blu-ray Disc box set on August 28, 2013, and another, 15th, was released with the third one on October 25, 2013. The sets also include subtitles in English. At Anime Expo 2013, Viz Media announced their license to the anime, as well as plans to stream the series on their website and Hulu and release it on DVD and Blu-ray Disc in 2014. On January 14, 2014, Manga Entertainment announced that it has licensed the series in the United Kingdom. The two-part OVA sequel, titled , was released in Fall 2014 and Spring 2015. A planned second season was unable to be produced; however, the scenario was turned into a pair of novels.

Reception
In April 2014, the series was nominated for the Seiun Award.

Notes

References

External links
 
 

2013 anime television series debuts
Anime with original screenplays
Bandai Visual
Enterbrain manga
Famitsu Bunko
Kadokawa Shoten manga
Mecha anime and manga
Pirates in anime and manga
Post-apocalyptic anime and manga
Production I.G
Science fantasy anime and manga
Shōnen manga
Studio Puyukai
Tokyo MX original programming
Viz Media anime